"Hail Caesar" is a song by the Australian rock band AC/DC, which was written by members and brothers, Angus and Malcolm Young. It is from their 1995 album Ballbreaker and was issued on 19 February 1996 as a single. The lyrics, "All Hail Caesar", are a reference to the salute given to Roman general Julius Caesar. An edited version of the song at 4:30 appeared only on promo releases of the single. Commercial single releases and the Ballbreaker album contain the full version at 5:14. The single reached the top 100 ARIA Singles Chart.

Music video
The music video for the song depicts the band playing on a large, step-pyramid-like structure, with a crowd of women in different attires (women in Roman togas, women in red one-piece swimsuit and swim caps, women in police or military dress uniforms) below marching to the song. Throughout the video, various movies and clips are displayed with Angus Young superimposed on them. This video was released on the DVD Family Jewels Disc 3 as part of the 2009 box set Backtracks.

Track listing

Personnel
Brian Johnson – lead vocals
Angus Young – lead guitar
Malcolm Young – rhythm guitar
Cliff Williams – bass guitar
Phil Rudd – drums
 Producer – Rick Rubin

Charts

References

External links
Lyrics

AC/DC songs
1995 singles
Songs written by Angus Young
Songs written by Malcolm Young
Song recordings produced by Rick Rubin
Songs about Julius Caesar